The 2008–09 Slovenian Second League season started on 10 August 2008 and ended on 24 May 2009. Each team played a total of 26 matches.

Clubs

League standing

See also
2008–09 Slovenian PrvaLiga
2008–09 Slovenian Third League

References
NZS archive

External links
Football Association of Slovenia 

Slovenian Second League seasons
2008–09 in Slovenian football
Slovenia